The old Piccadilly Cinema building is located in Sparkhill, Birmingham, England, and is situated on the Stratford Road.

It first opened in May 1930 under the name the Piccadilly Super Cinema and was designed by Harold Seymore Scott.

Its Compton Pipe Theatre Organ is now in Stonnington City Centre (formerly Malvern Town Hall) in Malvern, Victoria, Australia.

References 

Sparkhill
Former cinemas in England
Buildings and structures in Birmingham, West Midlands